Christopher Addae is an administrator and Ghanaian Politician who served as the member of the Fifth parliament of the Fourth Republic representing the Bibiani-Anhwiaso-Bekwai Constituency of the Western Region of Ghana. After he emerged the winner of the poll in his constituency in the 2008 Ghanaian general elections.

Early life and education 
Addae was born on 25 February 1963. He hails from Nambro-Sefwi Anhwiaso in the Western Region of Ghana. He obtained his Master of Arts degree in International Affairs from University of Ghana in 1992.

Career 
Addae worked as Manager and an Administrator. He was the District Chief Executive of Bibiani-Anhwiaso-Bekwai from 2001 to 2005.

Politics 
Addae was first elected into Parliament in December 2004 after the completion of the 2004 Ghanaian general elections. He also served as the member of parliament representing the Bibiani-Anhwiaso-Bekwai Constituency in the Western region under the umbrella of the New Patriotic Party, gaining 24,241 vote cast out of 48,624 valid votes in his Constituency.

Personal life 
Addae is married. He is a Christian and a member of the Seventh Day Adventist Church.

References 

1963 births
Living people
Ghanaian MPs 2005–2009
Ghanaian MPs 2009–2013
Ghanaian Christians
People from Western Region (Ghana)
University of Ghana alumni
New Patriotic Party politicians